Southmoore High School is an American four-year public high school located in the southern part of Moore, Oklahoma. Southmoore High School opened in the 2008–2009 academic year. The school is headed by one head principal, and 4 class principals. The current head principal is Chealsi Conley. Southmoore High is a 6A division High School.  It is part of the Moore Public Schools district.  The school is the third high school in the Moore public schools district.

Notable Alumni
Kendal Thompson former quarterback University of Oklahoma, and University of Utah, played wide receiver for Washington Redskins (2016-2017) and Los Angeles Rams (2018).

References

External links
 

Schools in Cleveland County, Oklahoma
Educational institutions established in 2008
2008 establishments in Oklahoma
Public high schools in Oklahoma